The phosphidosilicates or phosphosilicides are inorganic compounds containing silicon bonded to phosphorus and one or more other kinds of elements. In the phosphosilicates each silicon atom is surrounded by four phosphorus atoms in a tetrahedron. The triphosphosilicates have a SiP3 unit, that can be a planar triangle like carbonate CO3. The phosphorus atoms can be shared to form different patterns e.g.  [Si2P6]10− which forms pairs, and [Si3P7]3− which contains two-dimensional double layer sheets. [SiP4]8− with isolated tetrahedra, and [SiP2]2− with a three dimensional network with shared tetrahedron corners. SiP clusters can be joined, not only by sharing a P atom, but also by way of a P-P bond.  This does not happen with nitridosilicates or plain silicates.

The phosphidosilicates can be considered as a subclass of the pnictogenidosilicates, where P can be substituted by N (nitridosilicates), As, or Sb. Also Silicon can be substituted to form other series of compounds by replacement with other +4 oxidation state atoms like germanium, tin, titanium or even tantalum.

List

References

Silicon compounds
Phosphorus compounds